Siuri railway station (Station Code- SURI) is one of the major railway stations on Andal–Sainthia branch line under Asansol railway division. It serves Suri, the district Headquarters of Birbhum district in the Indian state of West Bengal, and the adjoining villages. The railway station is owned by Indian Railways and operated by Eastern Railway. A total number of 24 trains runs via Siuri. 2 trains terminates at Siuri and 2 trains originates from Siuri. This makes Siuri railway station the 7th busiest railway station in Birbhum district. Pilgrims and travellers visiting Bakreshwar Temple and hot springs in the village of Bakreshwar and Data Babar Mazaar (the Dargah of Data Saheb) in the village of Patharchapuri use this station.

History

Construction of the Andal–Sainthia section was completed in 1913. Construction of the Siuri railway station was done as part of building the entire line and that was the start of the Siuri railway station that year. Electrification work of this line was completed in 2016.

Location 

Siuri station is situated at Hatjan Bazar area in the southern part of Suri town, the District Headquarters of Birbhum district in the state of West Bengal in India. It is an important station on Andal–Sainthia branch line. Coming from Andal Junction railway station, the previous station of Siuri is Kachujor railway station and the next station of Siuri is Kunuri railway station

Amenities 

Siuri is a Model Railway station. Ticket counters for both reserved and un-reserved tickets are available here. Sheds, seats, drinking water, pay and use toilets, foot overbridge, digital clock etc. are available on the platforms. Separate waiting rooms for first and second class passengers are available here. Parking area is also provided in outside of the station building.

Important trains 

Some of the important trains that runs via Siuri are,

 Vananchal Express
 Surat–Malda Town Express
 Ranchi–Kamakhya Express
 Puri–Kamakhya Weekly Express (via Adra)
 Jhajha–Dibrugarh Weekly Express
 Mayurakshi Fast Passenger
 Nagaon Express
 Dibrugarh–Tambaram Express
 Hool Express
 Siuri-Sealdah MEMU Exp

Service 
Through Mail/Express and Passenger trains, this station connects Suri, the District Headquarters of Birbhum district with various places like Howrah, Kolkata, Bardhaman, Durgapur, Guwahati, Dibrugarh, Malda, Siliguri, Puri, Chennai, Surat, Jhajha, Asansol, Ranchi, Nagpur, Bilaspur, Bhubaneswar, Visakhapatnam, Dimapur, Jamshedpur, Purulia, Cuttack, Vijayawada, Raipur, Durg etc. Apart from Suri, people of surrounding areas like Rajnagar, Mohammad Bazar, Purandarpur etc. also use this station. Moreover, pilgrims and travellers visiting 'Bakreshwar Temple and 'hot springs in the village of Bakreshwar and Data Babar Mazaar (the Dargah of Data Saheb) in the village of Patharchapuri use this station.

Gallery

See also 

 Suri town
 Hool Express

References

Railway stations in Birbhum district
Asansol railway division